Microbates is a bird genus in the family Polioptilidae. 
Its name means "small creeper" or "walker".

Behavior

Feeding 
They usually prey upon small arthropods. Some species regularly and some often join mixed-species foraging flocks.

Vocalization
Microbates's song is a  "a series of soft, thin notes, peeee or eeeeea" or "a series of soft, clear, plaintive notes, teeeeea or teeeéuw"

Species 
It contains the following species:

 Tawny-faced gnatwren (Microbates cinereiventris)
 Collared gnatwren(Microbates collaris)

References 

 
Polioptilidae
Bird genera
Taxa named by Philip Sclater
Taxa named by Osbert Salvin
Taxonomy articles created by Polbot